Ian Kidd (born May 11, 1964) is an American former professional ice hockey defenseman. He played 30 games for the Vancouver Canucks of the National Hockey League (NHL) between 1987 and 1989, but spent the bulk of his professional career in the minor International Hockey League. Prior to turning professional Kidd played college hockey at the University of North Dakota, winning the NCAA championship in 1987. The Detroit Red Wings initially selected him first overall in the 1986 NHL Supplemental Draft, but the claim was invalidated after it was determined Kidd didn’t meet eligibility requirements.

Career statistics

Regular season and playoffs

Awards and honors

References

External links

1964 births
Living people
AHCA Division I men's ice hockey All-Americans
American men's ice hockey defensemen
Chicago Wolves (IHL) players
Cincinnati Cyclones (IHL) players
Fredericton Express players
Ice hockey people from Oregon
Milwaukee Admirals (IHL) players
NCAA men's ice hockey national champions
North Dakota Fighting Hawks men's ice hockey players
Penticton Knights players
Sportspeople from Gresham, Oregon
Undrafted National Hockey League players
Vancouver Canucks players